The Tenth Month is a 1979 American made-for-TV-movie based on the 1970 novel of the same name by Laura Z. Hobson. The movie was directed by Joan Tewkesbury and starred Carol Burnett, Keith Michell, and Dina Merrill.

Plot
An unmarried, middle-aged woman accidentally becomes pregnant by an internationally renowned pianist and decides to keep and raise the baby on her own.

Cast
 Carol Burnett as Dori Grey
 Keith Michell as Matthew Poole
 Dina Merrill as Cele
 Melissa Converse as Ellen Varley
 Cristina Raines as Nancy Miller
 Richard Venture as Dr. Paul Jessup
 Yvonne Wilder as Mrs. Figueroa
 Martine Beswick as Joan Poole
 Woodrow Parfrey as Tad Jones
 Joe Ponazecki as Dick Townsend
 Del Hinkley as Mark Donovan
 Jossie DeGuzman as Iliana
 Rex Robbins as Gene Varley
 Harriet Medin as Mrs. Cox, Lawyer
 Linda Grovenor as Molly Jamison
 Joe Seneca as Doorman
 Alberto Vazquez as Rinaldo
 Will Thompson as Cat Judge

Release
The Tenth Month aired on CBS September 16, 1979 and September 15, 1980. The film was released on VHS on April 7, 1987.

References

External links
 

1978 television films
1978 films
CBS network films
Films based on American novels
American pregnancy films
1970s pregnancy films
Films directed by Joan Tewkesbury
1970s American films